Márió Németh (born 1 May 1995) is a Hungarian football player who plays for Budafok.

Club career
After spending the first 10 seasons of his senior career with Haladás, on 2 June 2021 Németh moved to Diósgyőr.

On 1 July 2022, Németh signed with Budafok.

International career
He was part of the Hungarian U-19 at the 2014 UEFA European Under-19 Championship and U-20 team at the 2015 FIFA U-20 World Cup.

Club statistics

Updated to games played as of 19 May 2019.

References

External links
MLSZ 
HLSZ 

1995 births
People from Sárvár
Sportspeople from Vas County
Living people
Hungarian footballers
Hungary youth international footballers
Association football midfielders
Szombathelyi Haladás footballers
Diósgyőri VTK players
Budafoki LC footballers
Nemzeti Bajnokság I players
Nemzeti Bajnokság II players